Don’t Cry is a short, animated film by the Palestinian filmmaker Hisham Zreiq. The film is about a Palestinian girl, a Palestinian man and an Israeli woman meet at a celestial lake, the meeting triggers a conflict between the man and the woman caused by previous encounter, the girl tries to mediate.
In an interview with Zreiq in the Pan-Arabic culture online magazine of the London based The New Arab (Arabic: العربي الجديد) news agency said that the film uses symbolism, talking about the cycle of violence that always starts with an Israeli aggression, followed by a Palestinian reaction and results with more Palestinian deaths. Many symbols are to be seen in the film set, like a broken hourglass, a broken alarm clock and a slow-moving snail as symbol for the death of peace and the time stand still after the collapse of Oslo accords. Other symbols like a bullet and a stone, unbalanced scale symbolizing the unbalanced conflict.

Film festivals and awards
According to WAFA (Arabic: وفا) the National Palestine News Agency, Don't Cry was widely accepted by many festivals around the world, among that 11 festivals in Italy, and 10 in the USA
In November 2022, in an Interview for “Dafah Thaletha” Zreiq stated that his film Don't Cry was selected to 70 film festivals in 18 countries around the world, the film won 32 awards in 24 festivals, and that shows a great acceptance of the story and the quality of the animation.

Partial award list
 Award of Recognition: Animation, Accolade Global Film Competition, La Jolla, United States      
 Award of Recognition: Direction, Accolade Global Film Competition, La Jolla, USA
 Best short film, Dreamz Catcher International Film Festival, Kolkata, India
 Best short animation, Best Istanbul Film Festival, Istanbul, Turkey 
 Best animated film, Stanley Film Awards, London, UK
 Best Animation, Andromeda Film Festival, Istanbul, Turkey
 Honorable Mention, Mannheim Arts and Film Festival, Mannheim, Germany	
 Honorable Mention, Golden Lemur, Lisbon, Portugal

See also
 Hisham Zreiq
 The Sons of Eilaboun
 List of Palestinian films

External links
 
 
 Hisham Zreiq's official website

References

2022 short films
Palestinian animated short films
2000s German-language films
German animated short films
2022 films